Edward L. Kalafat (October 13, 1932 – October 7, 2019) was an American basketball player. A center, he played college basketball at the University of Minnesota and professionally, three seasons for the Minneapolis Lakers.

Biography
Kalafat was born on October 13, 1932 in Anaconda, Montana. He played football and basketball at Anaconda High School, winning a state championship in 1948.

After high school, he went on to play for the University of Minnesota. He was the team’s starting center from 1951 to 1954 and served as captain in the 1953-1954 season. He won the team MVP award his senior season.

After graduation, he was selected by the Lakers in the first round of the 1954 NBA draft with the ninth overall pick. He played three season with the Lakers averaging 7.1 points and 5.7 rebounds per game. Kalafat retired after the Lakers traded him to the Detroit Pistons in 1957.

After retiring from basketball Kalafat went into banking, working for many years at First Bank System. He also joined the U.S. Army Reserve retiring at the rank of captain.

References 

1932 births
2019 deaths
American men's basketball players
Basketball players from Montana
Centers (basketball)
Military personnel from Montana
Minnesota Golden Gophers men's basketball players
Minneapolis Lakers draft picks
Minneapolis Lakers players
People from Anaconda, Montana
United States Army reservists